Rogojeni may refer to several villages in Romania:

 Rogojeni, a village in Suceveni Commune, Galați County
 Rogojeni, a village in the town of Târgu Cărbuneşti, Gorj County

and to:

Rogojeni, a commune in Şoldăneşti district, Moldova